Holly T. Schepisi (born December 20, 1971) is an American lawyer, businesswoman, and Republican Party politician who is the New Jersey State Senator, representing the 39th legislative district. She previously served in the New Jersey General Assembly, from January 10, 2012, until March 24, 2021. She has served as Deputy Minority Leader since January 14, 2020, and served as Assistant Minority Leader for two years before then. She resides in River Vale with her husband Paul Garfinkel and their two children. In March 2015, she suffered a brain aneurysm but fully recovered after surgery in the summer of 2015. On March 9, 2021, she was chosen to succeed long-serving Senator Gerald Cardinale in the State Senate, following his death in office. She was sworn in on March 25, 2021.

Biography and early life
Schepisi is the daughter of John A. Schepisi, a lawyer and former chairman of the Bergen County Republican Organization. She earned a Bachelor of Arts degree from The Catholic University of America in politics and psychology in 1993, and a Juris Doctor from Fordham University School of Law in 1997. While in college, she worked at the 1992 Republican National Convention, interned for Organization of American States, Congresswoman Marge Roukema, and a member of the British Parliament. In 2007, she began serving as the Township Attorney for River Vale, a position she held until 2011. In addition, she was also a public defender for Oakland (2012–2014) and an alternate prosecutor for Old Tappan (2010–2011) and Westwood (2002–2011).

New Jersey Assembly 
In August 2011, Charlotte Vandervalk announced her retirement from the General Assembly seat in the 39th district. A resident of River Vale, Schepisi was selected by the Bergen County Republican Organization to take Vandervalk's place on the ballot, and in the general election she and her running mate Bob Schroeder defeated the Democratic candidates, Anthony Iannarelli Jr. and Michael McCarthy. She was sworn in on January 10, 2012.

Tenure 
In 2014, Schepisi introduced a bill that would have weakened vaccination requirements for school children. The bill would have allowed certain children under the age of six to attend school without receiving a Hepatitis B vaccine. Schepisi stated that the debunked link between vaccines and autism was not her "primary rationale" for introducing the bill. The bill did not become law. In the summer of 2017, Schepisi held the first of several planned public hearing in Paramus with various civic leaders on mandated affordable housing under the Mount Laurel Doctrine with local mayors and other state assembly members. In October 2018 Schepisi joined then-Republican State Senator Dawn Addiego and Republicans Kristin Corrado, Amy Handlin, DiAnne Gove, Serena DiMaso, BettyLou DeCroce, and Nancy Munoz in calling for an investigation into Governor Phil Murphy's hiring practices.

Committees 
Committee assignments for the current session are:
Community and Urban Affairs
Health, Human Services and Senior Citizens

District 39
Each of the 40 districts in the New Jersey Legislature has one representative in the New Jersey Senate and two members in the New Jersey General Assembly. The representatives from the 39th District for the 2022—23 Legislative Session are:
Senator Holly Schepisi (R)
Assemblyman Robert Auth (R)
Assemblywoman DeAnne DeFuccio (R)

Electoral history

New Jersey Senate

2021
Six months after being appointed to fill Sen. Cardinale's seat, Schepisi stood for re-election against Ruth Dugan—wife of the late State Senator James P. Dugan and herself an elected official on the Saddle River Board of Education.

New Jersey Assembly

2019 
In what was one of the most competitive races in 2019 Schepisi and her running mate Robert Auth won re-election by 6,000 and 4,000 votes respectively. During the campaign, controversy surrounding Assembly Minority Leader Jon Bramnick's law website drew their Democratic opponents, Gerald Falotico and John Birkner, to call on them to condemn the website.

2017 
In the tightest election of Schepisi's career in the Assembly she won re-election.

2015 
In a generally bad year for Republicans in New Jersey, Schepisi and Auth cruised to re-election.

2013 
In 2013 Governor Chris Christie easily beat Democrat Barbara Buono and Schepisi and her new running mate Robert Auth easily beat their Democratic opponents.

2011 
After the 2011 re-districting the 39th District was still widely considered "safe republican". Schepisi ran for the Assembly for the first time and easily placed second.

References

External links
Senator Holly T. Schepisi;s legislative web page, New Jersey Legislature

1971 births
Living people
21st-century American politicians
21st-century American women politicians
Businesspeople from New Jersey
Fordham University School of Law alumni
New Jersey lawyers
Republican Party members of the New Jersey General Assembly
Republican Party New Jersey state senators
People from River Vale, New Jersey
Politicians from Bergen County, New Jersey
Catholic University of America alumni
Women state legislators in New Jersey